Billy Minick (born January 10, 1939) is an American bull rider and stock contractor.

Life and career 
Minick was born in Fort Worth, Texas. He attended McNeese State University.

In 2018, Minick was inducted into the ProRodeo Hall of Fame.

References 

1939 births
Living people
Bull riders
Stock contractors
McNeese State University alumni
ProRodeo Hall of Fame inductees
Sportspeople from Fort Worth, Texas